The governor-general of Antigua and Barbuda is the representative of the monarch of Antigua and Barbuda, currently King Charles III. The official residence of the governor-general is Government House.

The position of governor-general was established when Antigua and Barbuda gained independence on 1 November 1981.

List of governors-general of Antigua and Barbuda
Following is a list of people who have served as governor-general of Antigua and Barbuda since independence in 1981.

Constitutional powers, functions and duties
The office of governor-general is provided for by Chapter III, Sections 22 to 26 of the Constitution. These state:

See also
Prime Minister of Antigua and Barbuda
List of colonial governors and administrators of Antigua

References

External links
 Georgetown University
 http://www.rulers.org/rula2.html#antigua_and_barbuda
 Archived Official Website

Antigua and Barbuda, Governors-General
Government of Antigua and Barbuda
 
Governors-General
Recipients of the Order of the Nation (Antigua and Barbuda)
1981 establishments in Antigua and Barbuda
Antigua and Barbuda politics-related lists